Sébastien Lareau and Alex O'Brien were the defending champions, but O'Brien did not participate this year.  Lareau partnered Jeff Tarango, losing in the first round.

Jacco Eltingh and Paul Haarhuis won the title, defeating David Macpherson and Richey Reneberg 7–6, 6–7, 6–2 in the final.

Seeds

Draw

Draw

Qualifying

Qualifying seeds

Qualifiers
  Mark Keil /  T. J. Middleton

Qualifying draw

References

External links
 Official results archive (ATP)
 Official results archive (ITF)

U.S. Pro Indoor
1998 ATP Tour